William M. Tuttle Jr. is a professor and author of several books of note on twentieth-century American history and African-American history.

Early life
After graduating from Denison University, Bill spent three years in the United States Air Force. He later earned a master's degree and a doctorate from the University of Wisconsin.

Career

Tuttle has been very influential in his field. He was a professor at the University of Kansas from 1967 until he retired in 2008, teaching American Studies in the University's Department of History. He was among the founders of the University's branch of the Association for the Study of African American Life and History. Additionally, he has published many scholarly articles and has won several awards, including the H.O.P.E. Teaching Award from the Class of 2001.

In 2018, Denison University awarded Tuttle with an honorary doctorate degree.

Bibliography

References 

References  
 

 

American male non-fiction writers
Historians of the United States
Writers from Detroit
1937 births
Living people